The fourth round of CONCACAF matches for 2018 FIFA World Cup qualification was played from 13 November 2015 to 6 September 2016.

Format
A total of 12 teams (teams ranked 1 to 6 in the CONCACAF entrant list and 6 third round winners) were divided into three groups of four teams each. In each group, teams played against each other home-and-away in a round-robin format for a total of six matches per team. The top two teams of each group (three group winners and three runners-up) advanced to the fifth round (also called the 'Hexagonal' or 'Hex').

Seeding
The draw for the fourth round was held as part of the 2018 FIFA World Cup Preliminary Draw on 25 July 2015, starting 18:00 MSK (UTC+3), at the Konstantinovsky Palace in Strelna, Saint Petersburg, Russia.

The seeding was based on the FIFA World Rankings of August 2014 (shown in parentheses). The six direct qualifiers are seeded into two pots:
Pot 1 contains the teams ranked 1–3.
Pot 2 contains the teams ranked 4–6.

Each group contained a team from Pot 1, a team from Pot 2, and two third round winners which were automatically allocated into each group (series winners 1 and 2 into Group A, series winners 3 and 4 into Group B, series winners 5 and 6 into Group C). As the draw was held before the third round was played, the identities of the third round winners were not known at the time of the draw. The fixtures of each group were automatically decided based on the respective pot or series won of each team.

Note: Bolded teams qualified for the fifth round.

Groups

Group A

Group B

Group C

Goalscorers

References

External links

Qualifiers – North, Central America and Caribbean: Round 4, FIFA.com
World Cup Qualifying – Men, CONCACAF.com

4
Qual4
Mexico at the 2018 FIFA World Cup
Costa Rica at the 2018 FIFA World Cup
Panama at the 2018 FIFA World Cup